Narendra Singh Khalsa is a Sikh Afghan politician. He is the Member of the Afghan Parliament (Wolesi Jirga). In January 2019, he secured a seat in the Lower House of the Parliament (Wolesi Jirga) after winning the 2018 Afghan parliamentary election on behalf of the Sikh and Hindu community.

He is the son of Awtar Singh Khalsa, a Sikh representative to the Loya Jirga from Paktia province of Afghanistan. His father Awtar Singh died in the September 2018 Jalalabad suicide bombing.

On 22 August 2021, Khalsa came to India along with other Indians who were rescued by Indian Forces from Afghanistan due to Taliban Siege of Afghanistan 2021.

References 

Members of the House of the People (Afghanistan)
Living people
Year of birth missing (living people)

Afghan Sikhs
Afghan people of Punjabi descent